Claudio Lombardo (born May 27, 1963 in Voghera) is a retired Italian professional football player.

1963 births
Living people
Italian footballers
Serie A players
Serie B players
Parma Calcio 1913 players
Inter Milan players
Cosenza Calcio 1914 players
U.S. Salernitana 1919 players
A.S. Gualdo Casacastalda players
A.C. Perugia Calcio players
S.S.D. Lucchese 1905 players
Carrarese Calcio players
A.S.D. HSL Derthona players
Association football defenders
Asti Calcio F.C. players
A.S.D. AVC Vogherese 1919 players